Lawrence Oglethorpe Gostin (born October 19, 1949) is an American law professor who specializes in public health law.  He was a Fulbright Fellow and is best known as the author of the Model State Emergency Health Powers Act and as a significant contributor to journals on medicine and law.

Early life and education 
Larry Gostin was born in New York City in 1949, the son of Joseph and Sylvia Gostin. He received a B.A. in psychology from the State University of New York at Brockport in 1971 and a J.D. from Duke Law School in 1974.

He was an adjunct professor at Harvard University from 1986 to 1994 and went on to be a professor of law at Georgetown University's Law Center and a professor of law and public health at Johns Hopkins University's School of Hygiene and Public Health.

Career in health law
In the 1970's, Gostin relocated to the United Kingdom and joined the mental health charity MIND, where he helped establish its Legal Welfare and Rights Department in 1975. He served as the organization's legal director until 1983. During his time at MIND, he was instrumental in the organization's campaign regarding reform of mental health legislation. According to Jennifer Brown, Gostin's writings on "new legalism" – a regulatory philosophy which combined protection of mental health patients' civil rights with entitlement to proper mental health treatment – was a big influence on the Mental Health Act 1983. Gostin himself estimated that two thirds of the act were based on proposals from MIND or from his writings. As legal director of MIND, Gostin also oversaw the filing of many test cases at the European Commission of Human Rights and European Court of Human Rights "highlighting the absence of possibilities for a legal review of detention [under UK mental health legislation] for many."

From January 1984 to 1985, Gostin was general secretary of the National Council for Civil Liberties in the United Kingdom. From 1986 to 1994, he was executive director of the American Society for Law, Medicine, and Bioethics.   He worked on Hillary Clinton's health plan, serving as chairman of the health information privacy and public health committees of the President's Task Force on Health Care Reform.

His proposed Model State Emergency Health Powers Act ignited a firestorm of controversy across the ideological spectrum, from Phyllis Schlafly to LAMBDA, for being overly broad and ripe for abuse.

He is also Professor of Public Health at the Johns Hopkins University and Director of the Center for Law & the Public's Health at Johns Hopkins and Georgetown Universities—A Collaborating Center of the World Health Organization and the Centers for Disease Control and Prevention. He is Adjunct Professor of Public Health (Faculty of Medical Sciences) and Research Fellow (Centre for Socio-Legal Studies) at Oxford University.

Gostin chairs a World Health Organization project on the law and ethics of public health strategies for pandemic influenza and is leading a drafting team on developing a Model Public Health Law for the World Health Organization.

In a January 25, 2020 interview with NPR, Gostin argued against travel restrictions to prevent the spread of coronavirus, stating, “The risk is extraordinarily low for people in the United States.”

In an April 2021 interview with Vox, he described his previous belief about travel restrictions being bad as an "almost religious belief" with no evidence behind it, saying “I have now realized [..] that our belief about travel restrictions was just that — a belief. It was evidence-free”.  

He is the Linda D. and Timothy J. O'Neill Professor of Global Health Law at the Georgetown University Law Center, where he directs the O'Neill Institute for National and Global Health Law."Faculty Profile: Lawrence Gostin", O’Neill Institute for National and Global Health Law, Georgetown University

Awards and honours
 1994, the Chancellor of the State University of New York conferred an Honorary Doctor of Laws Degree. 
 2006, Her Majesty Queen Elizabeth II and the Vice Chancellor awarded Cardiff University's (Wales) highest honor, an Honorary Fellow. 
 Elected lifetime Member of the Institute of Medicine, National Academy of Sciences. 
 2006, the IOM awarded Gostin the Adam Yarmolinsky Medal. 
 He has received the Rosemary Delbridge Memorial Award from the National Consumer Council (U.K.) for the person "who has most influenced Parliament and government to act for the welfare of society." 
 Received the Key to Tohoko University (Japan) for distinguished contributions to human rights in mental health. 
 At the CDC Public Health Law Conference in 2006, he received the Public Health Law Association Distinguished Lifetime Achievement Award "in recognition of a career devoted to using law to improve the public's health." 
 He is an elected fellow of the Hastings Center, an independent bioethics research institution.

Books
 Foundations of Global Health & Human Rights (co-editor; Oxford University Press, 2020)
 Human Rights in Global Health: Rights-Based Governance for a Globalizing World (co-editor; Oxford University Press, 2018)
 Principles of Mental Health Law and Policy (co-author; Oxford University Press, 2010)
 Public Health Law: Power, Duty, Restraint (University of California Press and Milbank Memorial Fund, 2nd ed. 2008)
 Public Health Ethics: Theory, Policy and Practice (Oxford University Press, 2007)
 The AIDS Pandemic: Complacency, Injustice, and Unfulfilled Expectations (University of North Carolina Press, 2004)
 The Human Rights of Persons with Intellectual Disabilities: Different But Equal (Oxford University Press, 2003)
 Public Health Law and Ethics: A Reader (University of California Press and Milbank Memorial Fund, 2002)

References

Further reading 
 Watts, Geoff, "Profile: Lawrence Gostin: legal activist in the cause of global health", The Lancet, Vol 386 November 28, 2015

External links
Gostin's long form CV with a full bibliography of his published writings, O’Neill Institute for National and Global Health Law, Georgetown University

The Center for Law and the Public's Health site (archived 4/22/2001 copy)

1949 births
Living people
American expatriates in England
Duke University School of Law alumni
Georgetown University Law Center faculty
Harvard University faculty
Hastings Center Fellows
Johns Hopkins University faculty
State University of New York at Brockport alumni
Members of the National Academy of Medicine